Iqbal Qureshi (12 May 1930 — 21 March 1998) was an Indian music composer and director, credited with film scores for several Hindi films between 1958 and 1986, best known for his music to the song "Ek Chameli Ke Mandve Tale" in the film Cha Cha Cha (1964), the first Indian film to feature Western dance.His interest in music began as a child when he sang for private gatherings and for All India Radio. He became involved in the Indian People's Theatre Association when he moved to Mumbai as an adult and began to direct music for dramas.

His first credit was for composing music for the film Panchayat (1958), and subsequent films included Bindiya (1960), Love in Simla (1960), Banarsi Thug (1962) and then Yeh Dil Kisko Doon (1963). His compositions have included music for songs sung by Mohammed Rafi, Mukesh, Mahendra Kapoor, and three Mangeshkar sisters; Lata, Asha and Usha. His music has provided the sound to lyrics by Makhdoom Mohiuddin, Neeraj and Kaifi Azmi. Actors including Helen, Joy Mukherjee, Sadhana, Manoj Kumar and Shashi Kapoor have performed to his tunes.

His later work included composing the music in Alam Ara (1973), the remake of the first Indian talkie film Alam Ara (1931).

Early life
Iqbal Qureshi was born on 12 May 1930 in Aurangabad (now in Maharashtra), and later moved to Hyderabad. As a child he performed for All India Radio. Prior to entering the film industry, he sang at private gatherings and was friends with the poet Makhdoom Mohiuddin and actor/director Chandrashekhar. When he subsequently moved to Mumbai (then known as Bombay), he became involved in directing dramas for the Indian People's Theatre Association. He was taller than six feet and had long hair.

Career
Qureshi is credited with several film scores. These have included music to songs sung by Mohammed Rafi, Mukesh, Mahendra Kapoor, Mubarak Begum, and three Mangeshkar sisters; Lata, Asha and Usha. His music has provided the sound to lyrics by Makhdoom Mohiuddin, Neeraj, and Kaifi Azmi. Actors including Helen, Joy Mukherjee, Sadhana, Manoj Kumar and Shashi Kapoor have performed to his tunes.

He composed music for 10 songs in the 1958 film Panchayat, in which he combined folk and classical music and promoted the use of the been and the kanch tarang glass instrument in the song "Tha Thaiya Karke Aana". The duet was sung by Lata Mangeshkar and Geeta Dutt.

In 1960, he composed music for two films; Bindiya and Love in Simla, both with songs written by Rajendra Krishan and sung by Mohammed Rafi. The tunes to two of these songs, "Main Apne Aap Se Ghabra Gaya Hoon" and "Yoon zindagi ke raaste sanwaarte chale gaye" showed how Rafi could reach high pitched notes. Qureshi's "Gaal Gulabi Kiske Hain" in Love in Simla, sung by Rafi and starring the then new actor Joy Mukherjee, was hummed for years to come.

The following year he composed music for the film Umar Qaid, which included the sad ghazal "Mujhe raat din ye khayaal hai, woh nazar se mujhko gira na dein", written by Hasrat and sung by Mukesh.

In 1963 Qureshi produced the music for the song "Hamen Dam Dai Ke" sung by Mubarak Begum and Asha Bhosle, for the film Yeh Dil Kisko Doon, which saw the debut of Shashi Kapoor.

He composed and directed the music for Chandrashekhar's 1964 film Cha Cha Cha, which featured Helen in her first leading role. The film included the song "Subah Na Aayi Shaam Na Aayi", written by the then new song writer Neeraj, and sung by Rafi. From that film, he became best known for composing the music to Makhdoom Mohiuddin's poem "Chara Gar", depicted in the song "Ek Chameli Ke Mandve Tale", which tells the story of two lovers who can never be together. The music was described by Indian film music historian Manek Premchand as Qureshi's "best efforts".

After 1964, the films he contributed to were not as successful. He composed the music in Alam Ara (1973), the remake of the first Indian talkie film Alam Ara'' (1931). By 1986, he had directed the music for 25 Hindi films.

Death
Qureshi died at home in Vile Parle, Mumbai, on 21 March 1998, weeks after giving a television interview.

Selected filmography

References

External links
 

Indian composers
1930 births
1998 deaths
People from Aurangabad, Maharashtra
20th-century Indian male singers
20th-century Indian singers
Indian child singers
Hindi film score composers
Indian male composers
Indian People's Theatre Association people